Piruzeh (also Romanized as Pīrūzeh; also known as Fīrūzeh) is a village in Zalu Ab Rural District, in the Central District of Ravansar County, Kermanshah Province, Iran. At the 2006 census, its population was 44, in 10 families.

References 

Populated places in Ravansar County